Eugene Mullen (1898–1953) was an Irish Fianna Fáil politician, professor and priest.

Mullen was born in Roemore, Breaffy, County Mayo, to national school teacher parents, Thomas and Mary Mullen. A schoolteacher by profession, he was elected to Dáil Éireann as a Fianna Fáil Teachta Dála (TD) for the Mayo South constituency at the June 1927 general election. He lost his seat at the September 1927 general election having only served 3 months as a TD.

Mullen subsequently became a professor. Later, on 16 December 1938, he joined the Order of the Discalced Carmelites, assuming the name Father Ephraim.  As a Carmelite monk, Mullen wrote the epic poem Ode to St. Patrick as well as other lyrical pieces.

His younger brother Thomas Mullen, was a TD for the Dublin County constituency from 1938 to 1943.

References

Fianna Fáil TDs
Members of the 5th Dáil
Politicians from County Mayo
Irish schoolteachers
1898 births
1953 deaths
20th-century Irish Roman Catholic priests